Omakau is a settlement in Central Otago, New Zealand, located between Alexandra and Ranfurly on the northwest bank of the Manuherikia River. The smaller settlement of Ophir, New Zealand is located on the opposite bank, three kilometres to the southeast.

The New Zealand Ministry for Culture and Heritage gives a translation of "belonging to husband and wife" for Ōmakau. 

Omakau grew when the Otago Central Railway was opened in 1904. Today Omakau has a population of about 250, and is a stopover on both State Highway 85 and the Otago Rail Trail.

Omakau is the site of many historic buildings, including the local hotel built in 1898 and the Catholic Church. Omakau also hosts the Central Otago A&P Show at the local domain, which attracts people from all over the country in February.

Demographics
Omakau is described as a rural settlement by Statistics New Zealand. It is part of the much larger Manuherikia-Ida Valleys statistical area. 

Omakau and its surrounds had a population of 336 at the 2018 New Zealand census, an increase of 39 people (13.1%) since the 2013 census, and an increase of 39 people (13.1%) since the 2006 census. There were 138 households. There were 171 males and 165 females, giving a sex ratio of 1.04 males per female, with 57 people (17.0%) aged under 15 years, 33 (9.8%) aged 15 to 29, 147 (43.8%) aged 30 to 64, and 99 (29.5%) aged 65 or older.

Ethnicities were 91.1% European/Pākehā, 8.9% Māori, 0.9% Pacific peoples, 2.7% Asian, and 0.9% other ethnicities (totals add to more than 100% since people could identify with multiple ethnicities).

Although some people objected to giving their religion, 46.4% had no religion, 47.3% were Christian, 0.9% were Hindu and 0.9% had other religions.

Of those at least 15 years old, 30 (10.8%) people had a bachelor or higher degree, and 72 (25.8%) people had no formal qualifications. The employment status of those at least 15 was that 132 (47.3%) people were employed full-time, 69 (24.7%) were part-time, and 3 (1.1%) were unemployed.

Manuherikia-Ida Valleys

Manuherikia-Ida Valleys had a population of 1,119 at the 2018 New Zealand census, an increase of 99 people (9.7%) since the 2013 census, and an increase of 159 people (16.6%) since the 2006 census. There were 441 households. There were 594 males and 519 females, giving a sex ratio of 1.14 males per female. The median age was 43.9 years (compared with 37.4 years nationally), with 219 people (19.6%) aged under 15 years, 132 (11.8%) aged 15 to 29, 564 (50.4%) aged 30 to 64, and 204 (18.2%) aged 65 or older.

Ethnicities were 93.3% European/Pākehā, 8.0% Māori, 0.5% Pacific peoples, 1.6% Asian, and 2.1% other ethnicities (totals add to more than 100% since people could identify with multiple ethnicities).

The proportion of people born overseas was 10.5%, compared with 27.1% nationally.

Although some people objected to giving their religion, 54.7% had no religion, 37.3% were Christian, 0.3% were Hindu, 0.3% were Buddhist and 0.3% had other religions.

Of those at least 15 years old, 162 (18.0%) people had a bachelor or higher degree, and 171 (19.0%) people had no formal qualifications. The median income was $33,900, compared with $31,800 nationally. 90 people (10.0%) earned over $70,000 compared to 17.2% nationally. The employment status of those at least 15 was that 519 (57.7%) people were employed full-time, 180 (20.0%) were part-time, and 9 (1.0%) were unemployed.

Education

The school opened in 1935, and is the only remaining one of 13 schools which at one point served the Manuherikia Valley area.

References 

Populated places in Otago
Central Otago District